Edwin Burdette Tunis (1897–1973) was an American painter, mural artist, book illustrator, radio announcer, actor, theater set designer and author.

As a children's writer Tunis was one runner-up for the Newbery Medal in 1962. He also won the Thomas A. Edison Foundation Children's Book Award for special excellence in portraying America's past.

He wrote and illustrated several books, including: Oars, Sails, and Steam: A Picture Book of Ships; Weapons; Wheels; Colonial Living; and Indians.

Early life

Tunis was born in Cold Spring Harbor, New York, on December 8, 1897. He grew up moving a lot because his father's job was installing steam engines at factories all over the country.

As an adult he lived most of his life in Maryland.

References

External links

Guide to the Edwin Tunis Papers 1951–1973  in the University of Oregon Libraries at NWDA.org (multi-University online library)
 

1897 births
1973 deaths
20th-century American painters
American male painters
American muralists
American illustrators
American set designers
American children's writers
Children's non-fiction writers
Newbery Honor winners
People from Cold Spring Harbor, New York
Painters from New York (state)
Painters from Maryland
20th-century American male artists